Peter Boyle de Blaquière (April 26, 1783 – October 23, 1860) was a political figure in Upper Canada and the first chancellor of the University of Toronto.

Life 
He was born in Dublin, Ireland in 1783, the son of John Blaquiere, himself son of Jean de Blaquiere who emigrated from France. He served in the Royal Navy aboard  under Captain William Bligh, was forced off Director at the Nore with Bligh in 1797 and later fought at the Battle of Camperdown. After he retired from the Navy, he settled in Southampton, England. He came to Upper Canada in 1837 and settled in the town of Woodstock.

He served as a lieutenant-colonel in the Oxford militia during the Upper Canada Rebellion. He was appointed to the Legislative Council in 1839 and, in 1841, became a member of the Legislative Council of the united Province of Canada. In 1842, he became warden for the Brock District.

In 1849, King's College, affiliated with the Church of England, became the University of Toronto, independent of the church, and, in 1850, de Blaquière became chancellor. In response, Bishop John Strachan established Trinity College as a church university in 1852; it would later join with the University of Toronto.

He resigned as chancellor in 1853 to protest changes to the University's structure. He died in Yorkville, Toronto in 1860.

External links 
Biography at the Dictionary of Canadian Biography Online

De Blaquiere, Peter Boyle
De Blaquiere, Peter Boyle
19th-century Irish people
Deblaq
De Blaq
De Blaquiere, Peter Boyle
De Blaquiere, Peter Boyle
De Blaquiere, Peter Boyle
De Blaq
Younger sons of barons
Immigrants to Upper Canada
De Blaq